Scott Hastings (born 4 December 1964) is a Scottish sports commentator and former Scotland international rugby union player. At the point of his retiral, he was Scotland's most-capped player ever, but this record has now been beaten. He played for Edinburgh District and when that provincial side turned professional he played for Edinburgh Rugby. At amateur level he played for Watsonians.

Rugby Union career

Amateur career

Hastings played for Watsonians. While with Watsonians, they won the Scottish Premiership in the 1997-98 season; and the Melrose Sevens in 1996.

Provincial and professional career

He played for Edinburgh District. While with the district side, they won the Scottish Inter-District Championship for 3 successive [1986-87, 1987-88 and 1988-89] seasons.

He played for Combined Scottish Districts on 1 March 1986 against South of Scotland.

He played for and captained the Cities District side in their match against Australia on 3 November 1996.

When Scotland adopted the professional rugby union model in 1996, Hastings went on to play for and captain Edinburgh Rugby. He retired from professional rugby in January 1999. He guided Edinburgh Rugby to win the 1997-98 and 1998-99 Inter-District Championships.

International career

He was a full back when capped by Scotland Schools.

He received a Scotland 'B' cap against Italy 'B' on 7 December 1985 where he played at full back.

He then won 65 full senior caps at centre for Scotland from 1986 to 1997.

Although sometimes overshadowed by his brother Gavin, Scott Hastings is himself one of the greatest players in Scottish rugby history. Both brothers earned their first full senior cap on 17 January 1986 against France.

"He first entered the Scottish squad set-up in 1986 as one of the most cocksure personalities they had ever met. And while that wild joie de vivre and natural ebullience has sometimes since overspilled off the pitch, they have been a positive boon. In his early days, Scott was most notable for his searing pace, straight-running and ability to break the gain line virtually every time he received the ball. It was not long, however, before his bullocking runs from the centre were complemented by the stonewall defensive qualities which were to remain the salient quality in his game as his pace faded later on."

Bath also reminds us of Scott Hastings' proudest moment:
"If there is one moment for which he will long be remembered, it was during the 1990 Grand Slam decider, the proudest day in Scottish rugby history. English winger Rory Underwood had scythed through the Scottish defence when Hastings managed to drag him down short of the line when a try seemed inevitable."

In June 1996, Hastings made his 62nd Scotland full international appearance and became the country's most capped rugby player at the time, having previously jointly held the record with his brother Gavin.

Hastings was twice a member of the British Lions in 1989 (Australia) and 1993 (New Zealand). 

When touring with the British Lions in New Zealand in 1993 he sustained a cheekbone injury before the test matches and did not play against the All Blacks.

He played in 13 matches for the Barbarians, between 1986 and 2000, captaining the side against New Zealand in December 1993.

Media career

Hastings has appeared as a guest presenter on STV's daily lifestyle show The Hour on a few occasions – his first show being in November 2009, alongside main anchor Michelle McManus. The Scottish magazine programme airs weekdays at 5pm.

He was a co-commentator for ITV's coverage of the 2011 Rugby World Cup. On 10 July 2014, he made his début on the BBC's political discussion show Question Time. During the 2014 Scottish independence referendum, Hastings supported the Better Together No campaign against independence.

Scott was part of the ITV team covering the 2019 Rugby World Cup.

Charity work

In 2016 he and his wife Jenny were announced as ambassadors for mental health charity Support in Mind Scotland.

He has been a patron of MND Scotland. He is a supporter of the Euan MacDonald Centre, a research centre that is part of the University of Edinburgh and which looks at motor neurone disease.

Family and personal life

Scott is the younger brother of Scottish great Gavin Hastings. He was also a Lions and Scotland international rugby union player. 

Scott's daughter, Kerry-Anne was selected to play Hockey for Scotland in 2019.

In May 2022, he spoke about his diagnosis of non-Hodgkin's lymphoma and that he had received chemotherapy as treatment for this. Later that year he described that he had received his cancer diagnosis five years previously, and was now in remission.

References

Sources

 Bath, Richard (ed.) The Complete Book of Rugby (Seven Oaks Ltd, 1997 )

External links

 Scott Hastings on Sporting Heroes
 Scott Hastings - tribute in the Scotsman newspaper

1964 births
Living people
Scottish rugby union players
British & Irish Lions rugby union players from Scotland
Rugby union centres
People educated at George Watson's College
Scotland international rugby union players
Rugby union players from Edinburgh
Watsonians RFC players
Barbarian F.C. players
Scottish Districts (combined) players
Cities District players
Edinburgh District (rugby union) players
Scotland 'B' international rugby union players
Edinburgh Rugby players